The 8th National Film Awards, then known as State Awards for Films, presented by Ministry of Information and Broadcasting, India to felicitate the best of Indian Cinema released in 1960. Ceremony took place at Vigyan Bhavan, New Delhi on 31 March 1961 and awards were given by then Vice-President of India, Dr. Sarvepalli Radhakrishnan.

Starting with 8th National Film Awards, new category of awards for Educational Films was introduced. This category includes Prime Minister's gold medal and Certificate of Merit for second and third best educational film.

Awards 

Awards were divided into feature films and non-feature films.

President's gold medal for the All India Best Feature Film is now better known as National Film Award for Best Feature Film, whereas President's gold medal for the Best Documentary Film is analogous to today's National Film Award for Best Non-Feature Film. For children's films, Prime Minister's gold medal is now given as National Film Award for Best Children's Film. At the regional level, President's silver medal for Best Feature Film is now given as National Film Award for Best Feature Film in a particular language. Certificate of Merit in all the categories is discontinued over the years.

Feature films 

Feature films were awarded at All India as well as regional level. For the 8th National Film Awards, a Hindi film Anuradha won the President's gold medal for the All India Best Feature Film. Following were the awards given:

All India Award 

Following were the awards given in each category:

Regional Award 

The awards were given to the best films made in the regional languages of India. With 8th National Film Awards, new award category was introduced for the feature films made in Gujarati and Odia language. These newly introduced categories includes President's silver medal for Best Feature Film and Certificate of Merit for second and third best film in both the languages, although former was not given for Gujarati language as no film was found suitable for the award. Along with Gujarati, President's silver medal for Best Feature Film was also not given in Kannada language, instead Certificate of Merit was awarded. No awards were given in Assamese and Malayalam language as no film was found to be suitable.

Non-Feature films 

Non-feature film awards were given for the documentaries and educational films made in the country. Following were the awards given:

Documentaries

Educational films

Awards not given 

Following were the awards not given as no film was found to be suitable for the award:

 President's silver medal for Best Feature Film in Assamese
 President's silver medal for Best Feature Film in Kannada
 President's silver medal for Best Feature Film in Malayalam

References

External links 
 National Film Awards Archives
 Official Page for Directorate of Film Festivals, India

National Film Awards (India) ceremonies
1961 film awards
1961 in Indian cinema